Tunnel is a 2014 Nigerian drama film directed by Stanlee Ohikhuare and starring Nse Ikpe Etim, Femi Jacobs, Waje Iruobe and Lepacious Bose. The film tells a story on the life and struggles of a young pastor and his journey to ultimate fulfillment.

Cast
Nse Ikpe Etim
Femi Jacobs as Pastor Lade Olagbesan
Waje Iruobe as Sade
Patrick Doyle
Femi Akeredolu
Lepacious Bose

Release
The film premiered on 16 March 2014. It was released on IROKOtv on 4 September 2014.

Reception
Nollywood Reinvented gave it a 35% rating and praised the storyline and acting but felt it was not engaging enough.

See also
 List of Nigerian films of 2014

References

External links

English-language Nigerian films
2014 drama films
Nigerian drama films
2014 films
2014 Nigerian films
2010s English-language films